The UBC Thunderbirds women's basketball team represent the University of British Columbia in the Canada West Universities Athletic Association of U Sports women's basketball. The Thunderbirds (originally known as the Thunderettes) have won the Bronze Baby a total of five times, including the first three championships, spanning from 1972 to 1974. The last two national championships took place in 2004 and 2008. Both victories took place against the Regina Cougars. In 2004, the Thunderbirds defeated the Cougars by a 60-53 mark, while the 2008 triumph resulted in a 67-46 final.

History
The 2003-04 season marked a breakthrough for Carrie Watson. In addition to All-Canadian honours, Watson also won the Canada West and Canadian Interuniversity Sport Defensive Player of the Year Awards. She would also earn a pair of university honours, capturing the Marilyn Pomfret Trophy, recognizing the university's Female Athlete of the Year, along with the Thunderbirds Performance Leadership Award. Winning the Bronze Baby National Championship Trophy, the program's first since 1974, ending a 30-year drought, Watson's efforts resulted in National Championship MVP honours. In June of 2007, Watson would become the program's first full-time assistant coach.

From 2007 to 2020, the Thunderbirds would enjoy a 152-58 won-loss mark in Canada West league play. Capturing the national championship in 2008, the program would reach the national championship game once again in 2012, settling for a silver medal. At the 2015 CIS Women's Basketball Championship, the program emerged with a bronze medal.

Retiring in 2021, Debbie Huband was the longest serving coach in the history of Thunderbirds basketball. As the Thunderbirds head coach, Huband captured three national titles (2003-04, '05-06, '07-08) and four conference championships (2006-07, '07-08, '11-12, '14-15).

Season by season record

Statistics

Individual Leader Scoring

International
 Carrie Watson : 2006 FIBA World Championship for Women; Basketball at the 2007 Pan American Games; 2019 Winter Universiade Asst. Coach and Team Leader
 Keylyn Filewich:  Basketball at the 2019 Summer Universiade

Awards and honors
2004 Basketball BC University Female Athlete of the Year: Carrie Watson
2018 Sport BC In Her Footsteps Honouree: Debbie Huband

University Awards
2004 UBC Marilyn Pomfret Trophy (in recognition of UBC's Female Athlete of the Year), Carrie Watson
2004 UBC Thunderbirds Performance Leadership Award, Carrie Watson
2015 May Brown Trophy (Graduating Female Athlete of the Year): Kris Young
2016 UBC Thunderbirds Female Rookie of the Year: Jessica Hanson 
2019 TAC Performance Award: Keylyn Filewich

UBC Sports Hall of Fame
2016 inductee: Erica McGuinness 
2021 inductee: Carrie (Watson) Watts

Canada West Awards
 2003-04 Canada West Defensive Player of the Year: Carrie Watson
 2003-04 Canada West Coach of the Year: Debbie Huband

U Sports Awards
Peter Ennis Award (awarded to the Coach of the Year)
2003-04 Debbie Huband

Sylvia Sweeney Award (awarded to the Outstanding student-athlete)
1994-95 Adair Duncan

Kathy Shields Award (awarded to the Rookie of the year)
2002-03 Kelsey Blair

All-Canadians
2003-04: Carrie Watson,  CIS All-Canadian
2018-19: Keylyn Filewich – Second Team All-Canadian

National championship MVP
2007-08 Erica McGuinness, UBC
2005-06 Kelsey Blair, UBC
2003-04 Carrie Watson, UBC

Defensive Player of the year
2008-09 Leanne Evans, UBC
2003-04 Carrie Watson, UBC

Canada West Hall of Fame
UBC Thunderettes Women's Basketball Team (1969-75) - 2021 Inductee: Canada West Hall of Fame 
Joanne Sargent - 2019 inductee: Canada West Hall of Fame

Top 100
In celebration of the centennial anniversary of U SPORTS women’s basketball, a committee of U SPORTS women’s basketball coaches and partners revealed a list of the Top 100 women's basketball players. Commemorating the 100th anniversary of the first Canadian university women’s contest between the Queen’s Gaels and McGill Martlets on Feb. 6, 1920, the list of the Top 100 was gradually revealed over four weeks. Culminating with the All-Canadian Gala, which also recognized national award winners.  A total of 14 UBC players were named to the list. Although she played for Bishop's University, eventual Thunderbirds head coach Debbie Huband was also part of this list.

Thunderbirds in pro basketball

References 

Sport in British Columbia
 
U Sports women's basketball teams
Women in British Columbia